Pleasure Mad is a 1923 American silent drama film directed by Reginald Barker and starring Huntley Gordon, Mary Alden, and Norma Shearer. The film was written by A.P. Younger based upon the novel The Valley of Content by Blanche Upright.

Cast
 Huntley Gordon as Hugh Benton  
 Mary Alden as Marjorie Benton  
 Norma Shearer as Elinor Benton  
 William Collier Jr. as Howard Benton  
 Winifred Bryson as Geraldine de Lacy 
 Ward Crane as David Templeton  
 Frederick Truesdell as John Hammond  
 Joan Standing as Hulda

References

Bibliography
Jack Jacobs & Myron Braum. The Films of Norma Shearer. A. S. Barnes, 1976.

External links

1923 films
Films directed by Reginald Barker
American silent feature films
American black-and-white films
1920s English-language films
1920s American films